Surendra Mehata is an Indian politician from Bihar and a Member of the Bihar Legislative Assembly. Mehata won the Bachhwara Assembly constituency on BJP ticket in the 2020 Bihar Legislative Assembly election.

References

Living people
Bihar MLAs 2020–2025
Bharatiya Janata Party politicians from Bihar
1959 births